Esther Hobart Morris is a bronze sculpture depicting the first woman justice of the peace in the United States by Avard Fairbanks.

One copy is installed outside the Wyoming State Capitol, in Cheyenne, Wyoming.

Another is installed in the United States Capitol's Hall of Columns, in Washington, D.C., as part of the National Statuary Hall Collection. The statue was gifted by the U.S. state of Wyoming in 1960.

References

External links

 

1960 establishments in Washington, D.C.
Bronze sculptures in Washington, D.C.
Monuments and memorials in Washington, D.C.
Monuments and memorials in Wyoming
Monuments and memorials to women
Morris
Outdoor sculptures in Wyoming
Sculptures by Avard Fairbanks
Sculptures of women in Washington, D.C.
Sculptures of women in Wyoming
Statues in Wyoming